The women's 15 kilometre pursuit at the FIS Nordic World Ski Championships 2011 was held on 26 February 2011 at 11:30 CET. The defending world champion was Poland's Justyna Kowalczyk while the defending Olympic champion was Norway's Marit Bjørgen.

Results

References

FIS Nordic World Ski Championships 2011
2011 in Norwegian women's sport